The Church of San Pedro Apóstol (Spanish: Iglesia de San Pedro Apóstol) is a former Roman Catholic church located in Cantalojas, Spain. It was declared Bien de Interés Cultural in 1965.

The church was erected in the 12th-century.

References 

Bien de Interés Cultural landmarks in the Province of Guadalajara
Churches in the Province of Guadalajara
12th-century Roman Catholic church buildings in Spain